Josemir W. Sander, also known as Ley Sander, is the ES Professor of Neurology and Clinical Epilepsy at the Department of Clinical and Experimental Epilepsy, Institute of Neurology of University College London. He is Honorary Consultant Neurologist and Clinical Lead for Epilepsy at the National Hospital for Neurology and Neurosurgery, Queen Square, London and at the Epilepsy Society's Sir William Gowers Assessment Centre in Buckinghamshire. Sander is Head of the World Health Organization Collaborating Centre for Research and Training in Neurosciences, London and Medical Director of the Epilepsy Society, based at the Chalfont Centre for Epilepsy. Sander is also the Director for Scientific Research at SEIN –  in Heemstede.

Early life
Sander was born in Nova Petropolis, in the state of Rio Grande do Sul, Brazil. He qualified (M.D., 1981) at the Federal University of Paraná in Curitiba, Brazil and after his initial medical training in Brazil, he moved to the United Kingdom where he completed his medical and neurological training. He obtained his doctorate (Ph.D., 1991) at the Faculty of Medicine of the University of London.

He has served as a member of the Management Committee of the International League Against Epilepsy and of the Executive Committee of the International Bureau for Epilepsy. Sander is a member of numerous organisations and professional societies including the Royal Society of Medicine, the American Academy of Neurology, the American Epilepsy Society, the Association of British Neurologists and the British Medical Association. He is an elected Fellow of the Royal College of Physicians (FRCP). He is a former elected Trustee of Epilepsy Action.

Sander has published extensively on various aspects of epilepsy but particularly on drug issues, patient care, epidemiology and epilepsy care in resource-poor settings. He is a frequent speaker at International Conferences, and is a member of the Editorial Board of several specialist journals. The International League Against Epilepsy and the International Bureau for Epilepsy made him an Ambassador for Epilepsy in 1993. In 2009 he was named recipient of the Epilepsy Research Recognition Award for Clinical Science conferred by the American Epilepsy Society.

References

Professor Ley Sander, UCL Institute of Neurology
Epilepsy Action Trustees: Professor Ley Sander
Helsinki 7th European Congress on Epileptology
List of papers at PubMed

Living people
People from Rio Grande do Sul
Brazilian neurologists
Alumni of the University of London
Federal University of Paraná alumni
21st-century British medical doctors
Brazilian people of German descent
Fellows of the Royal College of Physicians
Year of birth missing (living people)